The Submerged Lands Act of 1953 is a U.S. federal law that recognized the title of the states to submerged navigable lands within their boundaries at the time they entered the Union. They include navigable waterways, such as rivers, as well as marine waters within the state's boundaries, generally three geographical miles (almost exactly ) from the coastline.

The Submerged Lands Act of 1953 was immediately followed by the Outer Continental Shelf Lands Act. Under the latter, the Secretary of the Interior is responsible for the administration of mineral exploration and development of the Outer Continental Shelf (O.C.S.). The Secretary of the Interior is empowered to grant leases to the highest qualified responsible bidder and to formulate regulations as necessary to carry out the provisions of the Act. O.C.S.L.A. provides guidelines for implementing an Outer Continental Shelf oil and gas exploration and development program.

References

External links
 

1953 in law
83rd United States Congress
United States federal public land legislation
United States federal legislation articles without infoboxes
Equal footing doctrine
United States public land law